The women's qualification rounds at the 2014 World Artistic Gymnastics Championships took place on October 5–6, 2014, in the Guangxi Gymnasium in Nanning.

Team qualification 

Lauren Mitchell was due to compete in the line up for the Australian women's team, but suffered an ankle injury in training before the qualification competition and was unable to compete.

Individual all-around

Vault

Uneven bars

Balance beam

Floor exercise

References

2014 World Artistic Gymnastics Championships
2014 in women's gymnastics